Mierzejewski (feminine Mierzejewska) is a Polish surname. Notable people include:

 Adrian Mierzejewski, Polish footballer
 Agnieszka Mierzejewska, Polish athlete
 Aleksandra Mierzejewska, Polish weightlifter
 Andrzej Mierzejewski, Polish cyclist
 Halina Mierzejewska, Polish linguist
 Hanna Mierzejewska, Polish politician
 Jacek Mierzejewski, Polish artist
 Jerzy Mierzejewski, Polish artist & pedagogue at Łódź Film School
 Łukasz Mierzejewski, Polish footballer

Polish-language surnames